Cinysca dunkeri is a species of sea snail, a marine gastropod mollusk in the family Areneidae.

Description
Cinysca dunkeri (Lüderitz-eastern Wild Coast) has a thick, rounded shell; uniformly pale on the west coast, speckled on the south coast. Umbilicus large and obvious. About eight strong, equal-sized ridges spiral around each whorl and corrugate the outer lip. Operculum horny and flexible, but has spiral rows of minute calcareous beads. Related to turban shells (Plate 78) although specifically resembling wrinkles.

Distribution
Cinysca dunkeri can be found off of South Africa and Nambia.

References

Areneidae
Gastropods described in 1852
Taxa named by Rodolfo Amando Philippi